George Thomas Breen (July 19, 1935 – November 9, 2019) was an American competition swimmer, four-time Olympic medalist, and world record-holder in three events.  After retiring as a swimmer, he became a coach at Jersey Wahoos Swim Club in New Jersey.

Background
Breen was born in Buffalo, New York.  He was a champion rower for Bishop Timon High School in Buffalo, and the West Side Rowing Club.  He began swimming competitively as a 17-year-old freshman at Cortland State University under coach Doc Counsilman, almost a decade later than most of his future rivals.

World competitor
Breen represented the United States at the 1956 Summer Olympics in Melbourne, Australia.  As a member of the second-place U.S. team in the men's 4×200-meter freestyle relay, Breen earned a silver medal, together with Dick Hanley, Bill Woolsey and Ford Konno.  He also took bronze medals in the 400-meter freestyle (4:32.5) and men's 1,500-meter freestyle (18:08.2) – after setting a new world record of 17:52.9 in the qualifying heats of the 1,500.

At the 1959 Pan American Games, he won a gold medal for his first-place finish in the 400-meter freestyle and a silver as the runner-up in the 1500-meter freestyle.  He was elected team captain of the U.S. men for the 1960 Summer Olympics in Rome, and earned another bronze medal while competing in the men's 1,500-meter freestyle (17:55.9).

Breen coached the Penn Quakers men's swimming team at the University of Pennsylvania from the late 1966 until 1982, and served as a coach for U.S. Swimming.  He formerly coached for Gloucester County Institute of Technology (Deptford, New Jersey) swim team (now separate from the school, it is known as the Greater Philadelphia Aquatic Club) and at the Jersey Wahoos Swim Club in Mount Laurel, New Jersey.

In 1975, Breen was inducted into the International Swimming Hall of Fame.

Later life and death
Breen was a resident of Washington Township, Gloucester County, New Jersey, where he coached local high school and club swim teams into his 70s. He was diagnosed with bone cancer of his right middle finger and had to have it amputated. After battling pancreatic cancer for several years, Breen died on November 9, 2019 in New Jersey.

See also

 List of Olympic medalists in swimming (men)
 World record progression 800 metres freestyle
 World record progression 1500 metres freestyle
 World record progression 4 × 200 metres freestyle relay

References

External links
 
 
  George Breen – Buffalo Sports Hall of Fame profile

1935 births
2019 deaths
American male freestyle swimmers
College men's swimmers in the United States
World record setters in swimming
Olympic bronze medalists for the United States in swimming
Olympic silver medalists for the United States in swimming
Penn Quakers coaches
People from Washington Township, Gloucester County, New Jersey
State University of New York at Cortland alumni
Swimmers at the 1956 Summer Olympics
Swimmers at the 1959 Pan American Games
Swimmers at the 1960 Summer Olympics
Medalists at the 1960 Summer Olympics
Medalists at the 1956 Summer Olympics
Pan American Games gold medalists for the United States
Pan American Games silver medalists for the United States
Pan American Games medalists in swimming
Medalists at the 1959 Pan American Games